Meerwein reaction may also refer to several chemical reactions named after Hans Meerwein:

 Meerwein arylation
 Meerwein–Ponndorf–Verley reduction
 Wagner–Meerwein rearrangement